Anne Morton married name Anne Buswell (born 20 May 1937) is a British former swimmer. She competed in the women's 100 metre butterfly at the 1956 Summer Olympics.

Morton also represented England in the 110 yards butterfly at the 1958 British Empire and Commonwealth Games in Cardiff, Wales. At the ASA National British Championships she won the 110 yards butterfly title in 1956.

References

1937 births
Living people
British female swimmers
Olympic swimmers of Great Britain
Swimmers at the 1956 Summer Olympics
Place of birth missing (living people)
Swimmers at the 1958 British Empire and Commonwealth Games
Commonwealth Games competitors for England
20th-century British women